Pivoxazepam is a drug which is a benzodiazepine derivative. It is the pivalate (2,2-dimethylpropanoate) ester of oxazepam. It has sedative and anxiolytic actions like those of other benzodiazepines. Compared to its parent drug, oxazepam, pivoxazepam is more rapidly absorbed and slightly more sedative.

See also
Benzodiazepine
List of benzodiazepines

References

Benzodiazepines
Chloroarenes
GABAA receptor positive allosteric modulators
Lactams
Pivalate esters